The Metra Electric District is an electrified commuter rail line owned and operated by Metra which connects Millennium Station (formerly Randolph Street Station), in downtown Chicago, with the city's southern suburbs. As of 2018, it is the fifth busiest of Metra's 11 lines, after the BNSF, UP-NW, UP-N, and UP-W Lines with nearly 7.7 million annual riders. While Metra does not explicitly refer to any of its lines by color, the timetable accents for the Metra Electric District are printed in bright "Panama orange" to reflect the line's origins with the Illinois Central Railroad (IC) and its Panama Limited passenger train. Apart from the spots where its tracks run parallel to other main lines, it is the only Metra line running entirely on dedicated passenger tracks, with no freight trains operating anywhere on the actual route itself (the only exceptions perhaps being occasional work or repair trains). The line is the only one in the Metra system with more than one station in Downtown Chicago, and also has the highest number of stations (49) of any Metra line.

It is the only Metra line powered by overhead lines, the only line with high-level platforms, and the only line with three service branches. Per a longstanding non-compete agreement, South Shore trains stopping at stations shared with the Electric District only pick up passengers heading eastbound (outbound from Chicago) and only discharge passengers heading westbound (inbound to the city).

As of May 2022, the  station is closed for reconstruction until summer 2023, with passengers being encouraged to use  or  stations as alternate options.

As of May 23, 2022, Metra operates 127 trains (62 inbound and 65 outbound) on the line on weekdays.

On Saturdays, Metra operates 41 roundtrip trains on the line, including 21 on the main line to University Park, 16 trains on the South Chicago branch, and four on the Blue Island branch.

On Sunday and holidays, Metra operates 22 trains on the line, with 12 roundtrips operating on the main line to University Park and 10 trains operating on the South Chicago branch. Service on the Blue Island branch is suspended during these times.

The Electric District has more frequent service than any other Metra line.

The stretch of the line from Millennium Station to 55th-56th-57th Street is the most heavily traveled section on the entire Metra system. The Metra Electric District has the best on-time performance of all Metra lines, averaging only one late train a month in 2014.

History

Steam era
The line was built by the Illinois Central Railroad, one of the first commuter services outside the major metropolitan areas of the northeastern United States. It opened on July 21, 1856 between the IC's then-downtown station, Great Central Station, (now Millennium Station) and Hyde Park. Part of the line was elevated for the World's Columbian Exposition of 1893 in Jackson Park.

The line predates the 1871 Great Chicago Fire, and ran on a trestle just offshore in Lake Michigan. After the fire, remains of buildings destroyed by the fire were dumped into the lake, creating landfill that forms the foundation of Grant Park, which the Metra Electric District runs through.

Two branches were added: from Brookdale southeast to South Chicago in the early 1880s, and from Kensington southwest to Blue Island in the early 1890s, both later electrified along with the main line.

When the IC moved its intercity operations to Central Station in 1893, it built Randolph Street Terminal on the former site of Great Central to handle its growing commuter operations.

Electrical IC era

By the early 20th century the IC operated up to 300 steam trains each day. In 1919, the IC and the Chicago city government collaborated to build a berm from the far south suburb of Homewood into the city. They also dug a trench from the near south side into the city proper, eliminating all grade crossings on the main line except one just south of the Richton Park station. The University Park extension required the line to cross a very long private driveway. The South Chicago branch runs at grade, crossing many city streets.

The grade crossing elimination project was followed by electrification. The IC electrified the commuter tracks in 1926, from downtown to Matteson. In addition to the removal of all grade crossings, the tracks were separated from, and moved to the west side of, the two freight and inter-city tracks. At McCormick Place just south of downtown Chicago, the two non-electrified tracks to Central Station crossed over the new electric alignment. The electric tracks continued north to Randolph Street Terminal.

The "IC Electric" was once Chicago's busiest suburban railroad, and carried a great deal of traffic within the city as well as to suburban communities. The three lines carried 26 million passengers in 1927, the first full year of electrified operation. Ridership rose to 35 million in 1929, and reached an all-time peak of 47 million in 1946.

Service was extended  southward from Matteson to Richton Park, a new station at the south end of the coach storage yard, in 1946.

The main line had six tracks between Roosevelt Road (Central Station) and 53rd Street (reduced to four in 1962), four to 111th Street, then two. The South Chicago branch has two tracks and the Blue Island branch has a single track.

1972 collision
The Illinois Central Gulf commuter rail crash, the worst rail accident in Chicago history, occurred on October 30, 1972. A commuter train made up of new lightweight bi-level Highliner cars, inbound to Randolph Street Station during the morning rush hour, overshot the 27th Street platform and backed up into the station. The bi-level train had already tripped the signals to green for the next train, an older, heavy steel single-level express  train. The single-level train telescoped the bi-level train, killing 45 passengers and injuring hundreds more, primarily in the bi-level train. A major contributing factor was that Illinois Central Gulf used a dark gray color scheme on the front ends of the Highliner fleet, which was very difficult to see on the cloudy morning of the accident. After the accident the ends of all of the ICG 1926 heavyweight still in use and Highliner MU fleet were partially painted with bright orange added for additional visibility.

RTA era

In 1976 the Regional Transportation Authority signed a contract with Illinois Central Gulf to fund its commuter service. On May 1, 1987 Metra bought the line and its branches for $28 million ($ adjusted for inflation). The line is now operated by Northeast Illinois Regional Commuter Rail Corporation, Metra's operating subsidiary. Two inter-city freight tracks retained by the ICG are now part of the Canadian National Railway, used by Amtrak's City of New Orleans, Illini and Saluki trains.

From 1988 onward, Randolph Street Terminal was under near-perpetual construction. The construction of Millennium Park moved the station completely underground, and in 2005 it was renamed Millennium Station.

The Metra Electric is the only line on the Metra system in which all stations (except 18th and 47th Streets, both flag stops) have ticket vending machines. The machines originally sold magnetically encoded tickets which unlocked the turnstiles. People with paper tickets or weekend passes, on reduced fares or who had trouble with the vending machines had to use a blue or orange pal phone to contact an operator who would unlock the turnstiles. Complaints from passengers who missed their trains caused Metra to remove the turnstiles in November 2003.

The main line and South Chicago branch run daily, but the Blue Island Branch does not operate on Sundays or holidays. A unique feature of the Metra Electric schedule is the similarity of the weekday and Saturday timetables. Many express trains run throughout the day in both directions. On other Metra lines, express service operates exclusively during the morning and afternoon rush hours. It is the only Metra line where all trackage is used exclusively for commuter service. Freight trains and Amtrak trains run on a pair of adjacent tracks owned by the Canadian National Railroad.

Off-peak and Saturday service is frequent, while Sunday service operates hourly north of 63rd Street and every 2 hours south of 63rd.

On January 4, 2021, fares on the Metra Electric line, along with the Rock Island line, were cut in half for all passengers.

Potential expansion or service alterations
The proposed Gold Line, derived from the earlier and more extensive Gray Line plan would have the Electric District operate more like a rapid transit line, by running trains more frequently (every ten minutes between 6am and midnight) with reduced-fare transfers to CTA buses and trains. Unlike the current service, which bypasses many stations to reach suburban stations more quickly, it would make all stops within the city. It would run from Millennium Station to South Chicago (93rd Street) at an estimated cost at $160 million.  Since the Gold Line was proposed, the idea of providing rapid transit service along Chicago's south lakefront has gained considerable support from neighborhoods along its route.  Despite its popular support, officials from CTA and Metra have largely dismissed the plan, focussing on other expansion projects. In response to this and other concerns, in 2009 the RTA and the Chicago Department of Transportation authorized $450,000 for a "South Lakefront Study" that is anticipated to yield either one or two new transit projects that are eligible for Federal transit funding.

An extension to Peotone, Illinois or the Proposed Chicago south suburban airport with a stop in Monee has been considered since the SouthWest Service was extended to Manhattan.

On May 24, 2017, Metra announced new schedule proposals for the line. The new schedule will provide rapid service for the Hyde Park stations every 20 minutes on weekdays until 7 p.m. and every half-hour on Saturdays. The proposed schedule also calls for boosting service on the main line from 63rd Street to Kensington, from every two hours to every hour. However, the proposed schedule also calls for the elimination of lightly used Blue Island trains, including all Saturday service.

After reviewing community feedback, Metra decided to keep four Saturday Blue Island trains and one late night trip to South Chicago. The new service went into effect September 11, 2017.

Ridership
Since 2014, annual ridership has declined from 9,415,916 to 1,836,723, an overall decline of 80.5%.

Rolling stock

The Metra Electric District uses second-generation bi-level Highliner multiple unit cars built by Nippon Sharyo. These will be supplemented by additional EMUs built at Nippon Sharyo's new Rochelle, IL facility opened in 2012. In 2005, these began to replace the original Highliner fleet built by St. Louis Car Company and Bombardier in the 1970s.

On February 12, 2016 the original Highliners left on their last run in revenue service. Metra confirmed in a Facebook post that twenty-four cars are being sent to museums around the Midwestern United States, including the Illinois Railway Museum, while an unconfirmed source stated that some cars were sent to Mendota, Illinois to be scrapped.

^1201-1226 are being leased to NICTD for use on the South Shore Line. All are being refurbished prior to being transferred over to the South Shore.
  ^To be renumbered

Stations

Main branch

South Chicago branch
The branch leaves the mainline south of the former 67th Street station.

Blue Island branch

Footnotes

References

External links

Metra / Electric District Schedules
Hyde Park Historical Society Article
Metra Electric District: History and Pictures

Metra lines
Passenger trains of the Illinois Central Railroad
Electric railways in Illinois
Railway lines in Chicago
1500 V DC railway electrification
Railway lines opened in 1856
1856 establishments in Illinois